CLG Ghleann Fhinne (Glenfin) is a Gaelic games club in the Glenfin Parish, County Donegal, Republic of Ireland. The club's home ground is Páirc Taobhoige. The Club’s chairperson is Paddy Doherty.

History
Manager Liam Breen led the club to the 2018 Donegal IFC.

Notable players

 Stephen McDermott — All-Ireland SFC semi-finalist: 2003
 Frank McGlynn — 2012 All-Ireland SFC winner; five times Ulster SFC winner; a Donegal All Star

Managers

Honours

Football
 Donegal Intermediate Football Championship: 1983, 2001, 2018 
 Ulster Intermediate Club Football Championship: 2001 
 Donegal Under-21 A Football Championship: 2002
 Donegal Under-21 B Football Championship: 2015

Ladies' football
 Donegal Senior Ladies Football Championship: 2011, 2017, 2018, 2020
 Ulster Ladies Senior Club Football Championship runner-up: 2011, 2018

References

Gaelic games clubs in County Donegal
Gaelic football clubs in County Donegal